A regional bank is a depository institution, i.e. a bank, savings and loan, or credit union, which is larger than a community bank, which operates below the state level,  but smaller than a national bank, which operates either nationally or internationally.  A regional bank is one that operates in one region of a country, such as a province or within a group of provinces.  The definition of what constitutes a regional bank is not precise.  They generally provide, with some limitations, the same services as larger banks, such as deposits; loans, leases, mortgages, and credit cards; ATM networks; securities brokerage; investment banking; insurance sales; and mutual fund and pension fund management.  The term is often used in stock trading, when referring to investing in different bank types, usually referred to as regional bank ETF's (exchange-traded funds).

List of regional banks

East West Bank (East West Bancorp)
Cambridge & Counties Bank UK
Opus BankCA
KeyCorp (KeyBank)
Suncorp Bank
Cadence Bank
M&T Bank
Valley National Bank
Regional Australia Bank

References

External links

Stock Focus: Regional Banks

Banks